Rehsiepen is a locality in the municipality Schmallenberg in the High Sauerland District in North Rhine-Westphalia, Germany.

The village has 113 inhabitants and lies in the east of the municipality of Schmallenberg at a height of around 556 m on the Landstraße 742. The river Sorpe flows through the village. Rehsiepen borders on the villages of Obersorpe, Altastenberg and Nesselbach.

Rehsiepen was first mentioned around 1600 as name in the statistics of the village Oberkirchen. The village used to belong to the municipality of Oberkirchen in Amt Schmallenberg until the end of 1974.

Gallery

External links 
Rehsiepen (Sorpetal)

References

Villages in North Rhine-Westphalia
Schmallenberg